Henri Manninen (born 3 January 1985) is a Finnish long distance runner who specialises in the marathon. He competed in the marathon event at the 2015 World Championships in Athletics in Beijing, China.

References

External links

1985 births
Living people
Finnish male long-distance runners
Finnish male marathon runners
World Athletics Championships athletes for Finland
Place of birth missing (living people)